General Bullard may refer to:

John W. Bullard Jr. (fl. 1980s–2010s), U.S. Marine Corps brigadier general
Robert Lee Bullard (1861–1947), U.S. Army lieutenant general
Terry L. Bullard (fl. 1990s–2020s), U.S. Air Force brigadier general